Clauseneae is one of the two tribes of the flowering plant family Rutaceae, subfamily Aurantioideae, the other being Citreae, which includes Citrus.

References 

 Wight & Arn 1834. Prodromus Florae Peninsulae Indiae Orientalis: containing abridged descriptions of the plants found in the peninsula of British India, arranged according to the natural system. Vol. I. XXXVII+480 pp. Parbury, Allen, & Co., London. https://www.biodiversitylibrary.org/page/3608847

Aurantioideae
Rosid tribes